Agreia bicolorata is a bacterium from the genus Agreia.

References

Microbacteriaceae
Bacteria described in 2001